Rudess/Morgenstein Project is an album by Jordan Rudess and Rod Morgenstein.  It came about after a power outage during a Dixie Dregs concert caused all of the Dregs' instruments to fail except Jordan's, so he and Rod improvised until power was restored and the concert could continue.  The chemistry between them was so strong that they decided to make their own album and subsequent tour. An Official Bootleg is also available.
The album also features an uncredited performance by Kip Winger at the end of the track Masada.

Track listing
All pieces are composed by Jordan Rudess and Rod Morgenstein.
Don't Look Down – 7:23
Sloth – 3:34
Drop the Puck – 3:50
Crossing Over – 7:35
Never Again (For Nan) – 3:46
Tailspin – 3:06
Odd Man Out – 3:43
Masada – 7:11
Cartoon Parade – 4:12
Over the Edge – 6:20

Personnel
Jordan Rudess - keyboards
Rod Morgenstein - drums

Production
Arranged & Produced By Jordan Rudess & Rod Morgenstein
Recorded & Engineered By Kip Winger
Mixed By John Guth, Kosaku Nakamura & Kip Winger
Mastered By John Guth

References

1997 albums